Dushmun is a 1972 Indian Hindi-language film produced by Premji and directed by Dulal Guha. It is based on a novel by Virendra Sharma. The film stars Rajesh Khanna in the title role and for which he received a Filmfare nomination as Best Actor, the only nomination for the film. Meena Kumari, Mumtaz, Bindu, Rehman, Asit Sen and Johnny Walker are part of the cast.

The film became a "super-hit" at the box office and stood 3rd in a major top ten list. The 2012 review of the film by the newspaper The Hindu stated: "Essaying the role of Surjit Singh, a reckless, macho truck driver, with a penchant for consuming desi liquor and visiting brothels, the actor can be described in only one word — superb. Wearing fatigues for most of the film and donning a moustache, Khanna looks every bit the truck driver he portrays. He adapts to the role, discarding his trademark mannerism and style of dialogue delivery for a sprightly walk and body language that smacks of arrogance."

This film was made in Tamil as Needhi in 1972, in Telugu as Khaidi Babai (1974), in Malayalam as Maattoly in Kannada as Hosa Theerpu (1983) and in Bengali as Nishpap Asami (1997) .

Plot
Surjit Singh is a rash truck driver often driving while impaired. One night he stops at the prostitute Chamelibai's home. He spends the night with her, and gets up late the next morning. He rushes out and drives at breakneck-speed in thick fog to make up for the lost time while again drinking. He ends up running over and killing a farmer named Ram Din. But despite the opportunity to run, he decides to stay and face the consequences. He is arrested by the police, charged, and brought before the court.

Surjit acknowledges his guilt to the Judge, who in turn knows that he should send Surjit to prison for two years. But moved by the plight of Ram Din's family (which include his widow Malti; his sister Kamla; two young sons; a crippled father Ganga Din, and his blind mother) and his inherent belief that imprisonment does not serve the good for victim or the perpetrator, the Judge resolves to try a novel experiment of forcing Surjit to live with Ram Din's family and look after their financial needs. A horrified Surjit attempts in vain to convince the Judge to change his ruling. He is transported to his new "prison" under police protection, where he is met by hostile villagers. Ram Din's family detest his presence, and call him "Dushmun" (enemy). Surjit attempts to escape on the first night, but is apprehended and brought back to serve his time.

Surjit gradually comes to terms with the twist of the fate that has forced him to become a farmer for subsistence and live under the ever unforgiving eyes of Ram Din's family. Over time, he starts sincerely working for the family and its interests. He meets Phoolmati, a happy-go-lucky girl who operates a small bioscope machine to entertain the village kids. They take an instant liking to each other, which blossoms into love. He also finds friends amongst the previously hostile villagers. He works hard on the family plot while also protecting it from the clutches of a local landlord, who has ill-intentioned designs on the land and also on Kamla.

Surmounting many obstacles, Surjit is able to arrange the marriage of Kamla with her childhood sweetheart. With the help of a benevolent police force and the Judge, he is also able to thwart the many attempts of the landlord to seize the family's land, and that of other villagers who have mortgaged their land with the same landlord. Malti however, is unable to forgive Surjit for having killed her husband.

Things take a dramatic turn for the worse when Surjit is framed and arrested for the accidental death of Phoolmati's drunk grandfather. At the same time, the landlord covertly sets the harvest, produced by Surjit and other villagers, on fire. He then has Phoolmati kidnapped, primarily to punish Surjit. Malti, who has been working in one of the landlord's saw mills thinking he is an honourable man, witnesses his misdeeds, and finally realizes her mistake. She is able to rescue Phoolmati, but gets trapped by the landlord instead, who attempts to rape her. Meanwhile, Surjit stages an escape from his holding cell and with the help of Phoolmati, is able to come to Malti's rescue in the nick of time. He confronts the landlord and violently assaults him as payback. The police show up and arrest the landlord for his role in defrauding the villagers and destroying their harvest.

Ram Din's family finally accept Surjit as one of their own, and arrange his marriage to Phoolmati. In a final twist though, his two years' imprisonment is complete, and the Police arrive to escort him back to town. He pleads with the Judge to let him serve a life sentence, and the Judge smiles, vindicated that his experiment has been successful.

Cast
 Meena Kumari as Malti 
 Rajesh Khanna as Surjeet Singh 
 Mumtaz as Phoolmati
 Naaz as Kamala
 Abhi Bhattacharya as Police Inspector
 Asit Sen as Head Constable Harishankar Chaurasiya
 Rehman as Judge
 Anwar Hussain as Timber Merchant
 Sajjan as Nainsukh
 Kanhaiyalal as Durga Prasad
 Nana Palsikar as Gangadin
 Leela Mishra as Mrs. Gangadin
 K. N. Singh as Public Prosecutor Saxena
 Ramayan Tiwari as Nana
 Murad as Supreme Court Judge
 Johnny Walker as Palmist 
 Bindu as Chameli Bai 
 Marutirao Parab as Barber
 Narbada Shankar as Panditji

Remake details

Soundtrack

References

External links
 

1970s Hindi-language films
1972 films
Fictional portrayals of police departments in India
Films scored by Laxmikant–Pyarelal
Hindi films remade in other languages
Films about landlords
Films directed by Dulal Guha